The 1983 Anambra State gubernatorial election occurred in Nigeria on August 13, 1983. The NPN nominee Christian Onoh won the election, defeating other candidates.

Christian Onoh emerged NPN candidate.

Electoral system
The Governor of Anambra State is elected using the plurality voting system.

Primary election

NPN primary
The NPN primary election was won by Christian Onoh.

Results

References 

Anambra State gubernatorial elections
Ama
Anambra State gubernatorial election